Aleksandar Vuksanović (born 3 November 1968), better known by his stage name Aca Lukas, is a Serbian pop-folk singer and musician.

Career
Vukasnović began his career in the early nineties by performing alongside Serbian rock musician Viktorija and her band. His stage name comes from the Belgrade nightclub "Lukas", where he would sing during his beginnings. In 1994, Lukas released his debut album Ponos i laž (Pride and Lie) under ITV Melomarket. It was followed by Pesma od bola (Song Out Of Pain, 1996) and Lična karta (ID, 1998), on which he started working with prominent songwriters Marina Tucaković and Aleksandar Radulović Futa. The albums' title songs became two of his arguably best known songs. His signature hit, "Lična karta", coveres "Trauma" by Greek singer Anna Vissi. In November 1999, Lukas held his first solo concert in Pionir Hall, Belgrade to 10,000 fans.

During the early 2000s, Vuksanović was signed to Grand Production, under which he released the subsequent album Rođendan (Birthday, 2000). Same year, Lukas also performed at the Belgrade Fair to reported 20,000 people. His fifth album, titled Nešto protiv bolova (Something For the Pain) was released in 2002 through Music Star Production. It was succeeded by Istina je da lažem (The Truth Is That I Am Lying) in 2003 under BK Sound. During the next two years, Lukas would make a hiatus to focus on his substance addiction problem. He returned in 2006 with Jagnje moje (My Lamb), released under Grand Production. Lukas won the second Grand Festival with "Upali svetlo" in 2008, which was included on his eighth album Lešće.

In November 2010, he performed in the Belgrade Arena for the first time. In 2012, Lukas released Stil života (Lifestyle) through City Records. During the following years, he collaborated with Ivana Selakov on the singles "Daleko si" (2012), "Omaklo mi se" and "Ljubav u doba kokaina" (2015). In June 2013, Lukas held his biggest solo concert to date at the Marakana Stadium in Belgrade in front of 50,000 people. Between 2013 and 2018, he was a judge on the televised singing competition Zvezde Granda. In June 2014, he released a duet with Ceca, called "Ne zanosim se ja". In 2016, Vuksanović made a cameo appearance in the comedy film The Samurai in Autumn. A year later in April, Lukas collaborated with Mile Kitić and Saša Matić on "Da me je ona volela".

In March 2021, Vuksanović released his tenth studio album Uspavanka za ozbiljne bebe (Lullaby for Serious Babies) under City Records, which among other songs included duets "Kidaš me" and "Problem" with Milica Pavlović and Maya Berović, respectively. In June the same, Lukas promoted his autobiography, titled "To sam ja" (That Is Me), at the Terazije Theater. The book, which was written in collaboration with journalist Vanja Bulić, saw poor reception from the critical public. In March 2022, Lukas competed at the Pesma za Evroviziju '22 music festival with song the "Oksar" to represent Serbia at the Eurovision Song Contest 2022. In the finale, held on March 5, he placed fifth out of 18 final entries.

Personal life
Vuksanović was born on November 3, 1968, in Belgrade, and grew up in the downtown neighborhood of Karaburma. He graduated from a high school of music. 

He has four children from three different marriages. With his first wife, Svetlana, Lukas has a son and a daughter, named Lazar and Miljana. Lukas was later married to a woman named Nataša, with whom he welcomed his second son, Andrej. In April 2010, Vukasnović married Sonja Višnjić. The following year, they became parents to daughter Viktorija. On September 2, 2017, Lukas was reported for a physical assault by his wife. A day later, after pealding guilty, he was sentenced to 9 months of suspended sentence and 18 months of restriction order against his wife for domestic assault. Their divorce was finalized in September 2019.

Over the years, there have been reports of his substance abuse and gambling addiction problems. In 2002, Lukas admitted himself to a rehabilitation facility in Switzerland.

In February 2009, he was shot in the right leg in front of his apartment building in New Belgrade.

Legal issues
Following the assassination of Zoran Đinđić in 2003, Vuksanović was arrested for illegal gun possession during the police action Sablja and sentenced to four months of prison.

LGBT rights organization 'Da Se Zna!' filed a complaint against Vuksanović in August 2020 for hate speech against LGBT community during his television appearance on Happy TV in January 2018.

In November 2020, Vukasnović made misogynistic remarks against N1 journalist Žaklina Tatalović while appearing on a live talk show broadcast by TV Pink. Subsequently after receiving public denunciation, he made an apology, which was perceived as insincere by the public. In September 2022, it was reported that Vuksanović was criminally convicted for insults against Tatalović and ordered to pay her 250.000 RSD as well as to cover her court expenses.

After the final of the Serbian selection competition for the Eurovision Song Contest 2022, Pesma za Evroviziju '22, where Lukas had placed 5th in the final with the song "", he accused Serbian public broadcaster RTS of irregularities in the voting of the selection, stating he would file a criminal complaint against the head of the Radio Television of Serbia, its editor of entertainment program Olivera Kovačević and general director Dragan Bujošević for "stealing votes". RTS responded, stating that the SMS votes were counted automatically by software which did not allow interference. The Comtrade System Integration company, which set up the software to count the votes, said it was prepared to hand the votes to the authorities if requested to do so, adding that the same data is available from mobile phone operators. After the controversy, in April 2022, it was reported that RTS filled a lawsuit against Lukas for false reporting.

Discography

Studio albums
 Ponos i laž (1994)
 Pesme od bola (1996)
 Lična karta (1998)
 Rođendan (2000)
 Nešto protiv bolova (2001)
 Istina je da te lažem (2003)
 Jagnje moje (2006)
 Lešće (2008)
 Stil života (2012)
 Uspavanka za ozbiljne bebe (2021)

Cover albums
 Jedno veče u kafani (1998)
 Drugo veče u kafani (1999) 
 Još sam tu (za drugove) (1999)
 Zora beli... (1999)
 Aca Lukas & O.K. Band (2000)

Live albums
 Najveća žurka na Balkanu (1999)
 Žurka (2002)

Compilations
 The Best of Aca Lukas (2000)
 Aca Lukas - Hitovi (2008)
 Aca Lukas - Stil Zivota (2012)

Awards and nominations

See also
Music of Serbia
List of singers from Serbia
Turbo-folk

References

External links

1968 births
Living people
Singers from Belgrade
20th-century Serbian male singers
Serbian turbo-folk singers
Serbian folk-pop singers
Serbian folk singers
City Records artists
Grand Production artists
21st-century Serbian male singers
Pesma za Evroviziju contestants